Liha or Lyha is a Northwest Vietic language spoken in southwest of Nghe An province in Vietnam and a small trip of land in Bolikhamsai province, Laos, by a tribal group called Liha. Estimates in 1999 suggested that there were 300 Liha and unknown number of Liha speakers at the time.

References

Vietic languages
Languages of Laos
Languages of Vietnam
Endangered Austroasiatic languages